Craspedida is an order of choanoflagellate, with members with an exclusively organic covering.

Craspedid genera

Salpingoeca rosetta 
S. rosetta has been named for the rosette-shaped colonies formed by its cells. Recent studies show a bacterial sulfonolipid, called rosette inducing factor (RIF-1) produced by Algoriphagus machipongonensis triggers colony formation in S. rosetta.

References 

 Extended phylogeny of the Craspedida (Choanomonada). Alexandra Jeuck, Hartmut Arndt and Frank Nitsche, European Journal of Protistology, Volume 50, Issue 4, August 2014, Pages 430–443,

External links 

 
 'Craspedida at the World Register of Marine Species (WoRMS)

 
Opisthokont orders